Nook Farm (sometimes called Syke Estate) is an estate of council houses situated within the area of Syke, part of Rochdale, in Greater Manchester, England. It is named after the farm that used to occupy the area until the land was sold to Rochdale Council and building commenced in the early 20th century. Many of the roads on Nook Farm Estate begin with N i.e. Newark Road, Norton Road, Newlands Avenue, Netley Avenue and Nantwich Avenue. Since the 1980s many of the houses have been sold to occupiers under Right To Buy legislation and are now privately owned.

Areas of Rochdale
Housing estates in England